The 1912–13 Football League season was Birmingham Football Club's 21st in the Football League and their 13th in the Second Division. They finished in third place in the 20-team division, four points behind the promotion positions. They also took part in the 1912–13 FA Cup, entering at the first round proper and losing in that round to Manchester City.

Twenty-five players made at least one appearance in nationally organised first-team competition, and there were eleven different goalscorers. Forward Arthur Smith played in 38 of the 39 matches over the season, and full-back Billy Ball appeared in one fewer. Billy Jones was leading scorer with 16 goals, all of which came in the league.

Football League Second Division

League table (part)

FA Cup

Appearances and goals

See also
Birmingham City F.C. seasons

References
General
 Matthews, Tony (1995). Birmingham City: A Complete Record. Breedon Books (Derby). .
 Matthews, Tony (2010). Birmingham City: The Complete Record. DB Publishing (Derby). .
 Source for match dates and results: "Birmingham City 1912–1913: Results". Statto Organisation. Retrieved 20 May 2012.
 Source for lineups, appearances, goalscorers and attendances: Matthews (2010), Complete Record, pp. 270–71. Note that attendance figures are estimated.
 Source for kit: "Birmingham City". Historical Football Kits. Retrieved 22 May 2018.

Specific

Birmingham City F.C. seasons
Birmingham